Lewis v. Lewis & Clark Marine, Inc., 531 U.S. 438 (2001), was a decision by the Supreme Court of the United States involving an injunction under the Limitation of Liability Act and whether a district court acted properly in dissolving it.

Background
In 1998, James F. Lewis, a deckhand aboard a ship owned by Lewis & Clark Marine, Inc., claimed that he was injured when he tripped over a wire on the boat. Lewis then sued Lewis & Clark in Illinois County Court, for personal injuries claiming negligence under the Jones Act. Lewis & Clark had already filed a complaint for exoneration from, or limitation of, liability in the District Court under the Limitation of Liability Act (Act). Subsequently, the court approved a surety bond of $450,000, representing Lewis & Clark's interest in the vessel, ordered that any claim related to the incident be filed with the court within a specified period, and enjoined the filing or prosecution of any suits related to the incident. The injunction prevented Lewis from litigating his personal injury claims in state court and he moved to dissolve it. Ultimately, the court dissolved the injunction. The Eight Circuit Court of Appeals reversed.

Opinion of the Court
Justice Sandra Day O'Connor wrote the unanimous opinion of the Court which reversed the Eighth Circuit's decision. The Court held that because state courts may adjudicate claims like Lewis' against vessel owners so long as the owner's right to seek limitation of liability is protected, the Court of Appeals erred in reversing the District Court's decision to dissolve the injunction. Writing for the Court, Justice O'Connor rejected the respondent's proposal to make "run of the mill personal injury actions involving vessels a matter of exclusive federal jurisdiction except where the claimant happens to seek a jury trial."

See also
 Merchant Marine Act of 1920 (the "Jones Act")
 Personal injury

References

External links

United States Supreme Court cases
2001 in United States case law
United States admiralty case law
Maritime safety
United States Supreme Court cases of the Rehnquist Court